Sfax Desalination Plant is a sea water desalination plant under construction in the city of  Sfax in Tunisia. The facility is under development by the Tunisian water utility company, National Company for the Exploitation and Distribution of Water (French: Société Nationale d’Exploitation et de Distribution des Eaux) (Sonede).

A consortium of European and Egyptian companies has been selected to carry out the mechanical, civil and hydrological engineering works on the project. Construction is expected to take 54 months with completion anticipated in the first half of 2026.

Location

Overview
The main objective of this project is to improve the "quantity and quality of drinking water" available to the inhabitants of Sfax City and Sfax Governorate. Before the implementation of this infrastructure project, the supply of potable water in the vicinity of Sfax City was severely constrained. Residents have expressed their displeasure regarding the supply of drinking water availed to them.

The project involves the construction the laying of salt water intake pipes from the Mediterranean Sea, building of the desalination plant, laying of the brine discharge pipes back to the sea, a pumping station, a fresh-water storage facility and piping to take the fresh water to where it will enter the Sfax City water system.

Other infrastructure developments include the construction of a 
 150kV high voltage electricity transmission line that will bring the 40 megawatts to the desalination plant. The power line is expected to comprise 40 pylons. A substation will be built at the desalination plant, to mediate the wattage and amperage between the plant and power line.

Construction
A consortium of three companies was awarded the engineering, procurement and construction (EPC) contract, in August 2021. The table below details the members in the consortium.

The electrical installations, including the 150kV transmission line and the switchyard (substation) are the responsibility  the Tunisian electricity utility company, Tunisian Company of Electricity and Gas (STEG).

As part of he EPC contract, the Construction Consortium will operate the plant for a minimum of two years, before handing it over to Sonede.

Funding
The total budget for the project is reported as US$350 million (approx. €300 million or TND:960 million). Of the total an estimated €250 million (approx. $295 million or TND:800 million) was financed as a loan to the government of Tunisia, by the Japanese government, through the Japan International Cooperation Agency (JICA). The loan is repayable over a 25-year period, with a grace period of 7 years.

See also
 Desalination
 Water supply and sanitation in Tunisia

References

External links
 Construction of Sfax desalination plant in Tunisia to commence As of 15 August 2021.

Buildings and structures in Tunisia
Sfax Governorate
Water resources management